CMAP may refer to:
 Chicago Metropolitan Agency for Planning
 Cmap (font)
 Concept map
 CmapTools, concept mapping software.
 CMap Software (Professional Services Automation (PSA) software)
 Compound muscle action potential